This is a list of International Council of Yacht Clubs members.

References

Yacht clubs